Parody science, sometimes called spoof science, is the act of mocking science in a satirical way. Science can be parodied for a purpose, ranging from social commentary and making political points, to humor for its own sake.

Parody science is different from science humor or from real science that happens to be humorous, in that parody science has little or no basis in real science.

List of parody science resources 
 Annals of Improbable Research – Science humor journal that awards the Ig Nobel Prizes.
 Journal of Irreproducible Results  – Parody science journal since 1955.
 Science Made Stupid – 1985 parody science book by Tom Weller.
 Wyoming Institute of Technology: WIT – a satirical science website.
 Speculative Grammarian – "the premier scholarly journal featuring research in the neglected field of satirical linguistics".
 Dihydrogen monoxide parody, which exploits common fears about science to make people think that water is dangerous.
 Look Around You, a BBC scientific satire based on school science programmes from the '70s and '80s.
 The Journal of Astrological Big Data Ecology, website of satirical science articles, news and clickbait
 Ask Dr. Science, a humorous radio and television program.
 Worm Runner's Digest. The satirical flip-side of the Journal of Biological Psychology, known for such articles as "A Stress Analysis of a Strapless Evening Gown."
 Null Hypothesis: The Journal of Unlikely Science – a satirical science website.
 Sokal affair, physicist Alan Sokal's hoax paper entitled, "Transgressing the Boundaries: Towards a Transformative Hermeneutics of Quantum Gravity" was published in the journal Social Text.
 Experimental demonstration of the tomatotopic organization in the Soprano (Cantatrix sopranica L.), a fake research paper by the writer Georges Perec.
 Artificae Plantae: The taxonomy, ecology, and ethnobotany of the Simulacraceae.", Nat Bletter, Kurt A. Reynertson, Julie Velasquez Runk. An article about the discovery of plastic plants, published by botanists in a scientific journal.
 Isaac Asimov wrote several spoof scientific papers about the fictitious chemical compound Thiotimoline.
 Proceedings of the Natural Institute of Science – Online-only journal that publishes both satirical and real articles in a scientific journal format.
 Body Ritual Among the Nacirema, a satire of social anthropology research by Horace Miner.
 The unsuccessful self-treatment of a case of "writer's block", an article with literally no content, but cited over 70 times

See also 
 F.D.C. Willard – a cat cited as an author in scientific journals
 Mathematical joke
 Parody religion
 Pseudoscience

References

External links 
 Tom Weller Official website of the author of Science Made Stupid
 Dihydrogen Monoxide Official site on the Dangers of dihydrogen monoxide

Parodies
Humour in science